"Dixie Rose Deluxe's Honky-Tonk, Feed Store, Gun Shop, Used Car, Beer, Bait, BBQ, Barber Shop, Laundromat" is a song co-written and recorded by American country music artist Trent Willmon.  It was released in August 2004 as the second single from the album Trent Willmon.  The song reached #36 on the Billboard Hot Country Singles & Tracks chart.  The song was written by Willmon and Michael P. Heeney.

Content
The song is an up-tempo about a man who expresses desire for a woman named Becky Jo who works at the song's eponymous store.

Critical reception
Deborah Evans Price of Billboard reviewed the song favorably, saying that "the clever lyric serves up a picturesque look at an all-purpose rural retail outlet and the pretty employee that keeps a lovesick Romeo frequenting the establishment. The vocal is full of energy, and Rogers' production is taut".

Chart performance
Due to the length of the song's title, it was listed as just "Dixie Rose Deluxe's" on the charts.

References

2004 singles
2004 songs
Trent Willmon songs
Songs written by Michael P. Heeney
Songs written by Trent Willmon
Song recordings produced by Frank Rogers (record producer)
Columbia Records singles